Di Giuseppe is an Italian patronymic surname, meaning "son of Giuseppe".
People who share this surname include:

Enrico Di Giuseppe (1932–2005), American operatic tenor
Franco Di Giuseppe (1941–2021), Italian politician
Marcus di Giuseppe (born 1972), Brazilian footballer
Phil Di Giuseppe (born 1993),  Canadian ice hockey player

Italian-language surnames
Patronymic surnames
Surnames from given names